The 2018–19 New Mexico Lobos women's basketball team represented the University of New Mexico during the 2018–19 NCAA Division I women's basketball season. The Lobos, led by third year head coach Mike Bradbury. They played their home games at Dreamstyle Arena and were a member of the Mountain West Conference. They finished the season 24–7, 14–4 in Mountain West play to finish in second place. They lost in the  quarterfinals of the Mountain West Conference women's basketball tournament to San Diego State. They received an automatic bid to the Women's National Invitation Tournament where they got upset by Denver in the first round.

Roster

Schedule and results

|-
!colspan=9 style=| Exhibition

|-
!colspan=9 style=| Non-conference regular season

|-
!colspan=9 style=| Mountain West regular season

|-
!colspan=9 style=| Mountain West Women's Tournament

|-
!colspan=9 style=| WNI

Rankings
2018–19 NCAA Division I women's basketball rankings

See also
2018–19 New Mexico Lobos men's basketball team

References

New Mexico
New Mexico Lobos women's basketball seasons
New Mexico Lobos women's basketball
New Mexico Lobos women's basketball
New Mexico